Crystal Airport  is a private-use airport located six miles south of Pearblossom, California.

Facilities and aircraft 
Crystal Airport is primarily a Glider-port, that is home to the Southern California Soaring Academy, a glider school and FBO at the airport.  Its proximity to the San Gabriel Mountains makes it a popular soaring location because of excellent ridge lift, and thermal lift from its location in the high desert of California. It is located approximately 30 nm from Edwards Air Force Base, and the school has been previously contracted to train Air Force pilots how to fly gliders.

There are 39 aircraft based at this airport: 11 single-engine, and 28 gliders.

References

External links 

Airports in Los Angeles County, California